Ponta do Ouro-Kosi Bay Transfrontier Conservation Area (TFCA) is a larger conservation area conceived as an extension of the existing conservation parkland area of the iSimangaliso Wetland Park, to extend north into a similar area on the Mozambique side of the border, and including several other parks in the process. The parks to be included (in addition to one or two others) are:

 iSimangaliso Wetland Park (South Africa).
 Cape Vidal Game Reserve (South Africa).
 Mkuzi Game Reserve (South Africa).
 Sodwana Game Reserve (South Africa).
 Muputoland Marine Protected Area (South Africa).
 Kosi Bay Nature Reserve (South Africa).
 Maputo Protection Area (Mozambique).

See also
 Protected areas of South Africa
 List of World Heritage Sites in Africa
 List of conservation areas of Mozambique

References

External links
 Ponta do ouro partial marine reserve, Management plan

Protected areas of South Africa